is a Japanese ski jumper from Myōkō, Niigata.

Shimizu's debut in FIS Ski Jumping World Cup took place in November 2012 in Lillehammer. On 23 November 2013, he won bronze at a team event with Japan in Klingenthal at large hill.

His first name, Reruhi, refers to Austrian military officer Theodor Edler von Lerch, who introduced skiing to Japan in 1911.

References

1993 births
Living people
Japanese male ski jumpers
Ski jumpers at the 2014 Winter Olympics
Olympic ski jumpers of Japan
Olympic bronze medalists for Japan
Olympic medalists in ski jumping
Medalists at the 2014 Winter Olympics